Pluto's Judgement Day is a Mickey Mouse cartoon released theatrically in 1935. Although labeled a Mickey cartoon, the main star is Pluto. It was the 78th short film in the Mickey Mouse series to be released, the seventh of that year.

Plot
Pluto chases a kitten through a window and right into Mickey's lap, causing a mess in Mickey's house. Mickey sternly scolds Pluto for his mean and nasty attitude towards cats, adding that he will have "plenty to answer for on (his) judgement day" if he keeps this up. Mickey then goes off to wash the kitten while Pluto falls asleep in front of the fireplace.

While asleep, a phantom cat goads Pluto into chasing him, over Mickey's objections, and Pluto is lured into a trap where he is shackled and put on trial as the cats declare him "Public Enemy No. 1" for all his crimes against cats. All the cats Pluto tormented testify against him: a tubby kitten speaks of being flattened by a steamroller, a psychiatric patient is wheeled out to demonstrate the post-traumatic stress disorder he developed from Pluto's barking, and three young blackface kittens sing of how Pluto stole their meals and drowned their Uncle Tom (as Tom's nine ghosts briefly appear). Pluto is inevitably found guilty and is about to be burned alive at the stake by the angry cats, when he wakes up after a hot cinder from the fireplace strikes his rear. Pluto rushes off into the tub to ease the burn, and Mickey, washing the kitten, urges the two to make up, which each one readily does.

Voice cast
 Walt Disney as Mickey Mouse
 Pinto Colvig as Pluto
 Billy Bletcher as Cat Prosecutor
 Clarence Nash as the kitten & Cat Judge

Television
c. 1977 – The Wonderful World of Disney episode #5: "Halloween Hall o' Fame" (TV)

Home media
The short was released on December 4, 2001, on Walt Disney Treasures: Mickey Mouse in Living Color.

See also
Mickey Mouse (film series)

References

External links

1935 animated films
1930s Disney animated short films
1930s color films
Films about nightmares
Films directed by David Hand
Films produced by Walt Disney
Mickey Mouse short films
Pluto (Disney) short films
Films set in hell
The Devil in film
Films scored by Frank Churchill
Films scored by Leigh Harline
1935 films
Animated films about cats
Animated films about dogs
1930s American films